= Madam West =

- Origin: New York City
- Genres: Pop/rock, Indie Rock
- Years active: 2013–present
- Members: Sophie Chernin; Todd Martino; Will Clark; Jory Dawidowicz; Mike McDearmon
- Website: Official website

Madam West is an indie rock quintet that formed in Brooklyn, New York City in 2013.

== Overview ==
The band is fronted by lead vocalist Sophie Chernin. Other members include Todd Martino (keyboard and backing vocals), Mike McDearmon (drums), Will Clark (guitar), and Jory Dawidowicz (bass).

The band released their first EP Not Pictured in 2013. A video accompanying the EP's single "Darlin'" was subsequently released in 2014.

Preceding their debut LP, Madam West released single "Wade in the Water" in June 2015. The full album Loves You was later released on August 1, 2015.

Active in New York City's DIY and indie music festivals in 2015, Madam West performed at Northside Festival on Sat, Jun 13th, Gigawatts Festival on Sat, Jul 25th, and CMJ Music Marathon on Weds, Oct 14th.

In 2016, Madam West released the single "Wise Blood," based on the Flannery O'Connor book of the same name. It received a positive review in IMPOSE magazine.

In 2017, the band released another single, "L," which premiered on UK blog GoldFlakePaint.

On Feb. 20, 2018 the quintet premiered "Strongest Son," the first single off of its sophomore EP, on POPDUST. The second single, "Warm Bodies," premiered in Surviving the Golden Age.

On March 23, 2018, Madam West released the full EP Warm Bodies. The 6-song album, released digitally on Brooklyn boutique label Floordoor Records, received critical acclaim in multiple music outlets, including No Depression, All Around Sound, IMPOSE, Too Much Love, and Innocent Words.

== Discography ==
LPs

Loves You (2015)

1. Couch
2. Wade in the Water
3. Mr. Rodgers
4. Tiny Hammer
5. Anxiety Palace
6. On Purpose
7. Aurora
8. Younger
9. Darlin'
10. Epic Love Song No. 107

EPs
Not Pictured (2013)
Warm Bodies (2018)
1. Strongest Son
2. Warm Bodies
3. Erstwhile, Manatee
4. Seams
5. L
6. Wise Blood

Singles

1. L (2017)
2. Wise Blood (2017)
